James Wills may refer to:
James Wills (poet) (1790–1868), Irish writer and poet
James Anthony Wills (1912–1993), American painter
James 'Kimo' Wills (born 1975), American actor
James Wills (baseball), American baseball player
James Wills (cricketer) (1899–1949), Irish cricketer
Bob Wills (James Robert Wills, 1905–1975), American Western swing musician, songwriter, and bandleader
Jim Wills (1914–2007), Australian rules footballer
J. Elder Wills (James Ernest Elder Wills, 1900–1970), British art director

See also
James Shaw Willes (1814–1872), English judge